The Billboard Top Latin albums chart, published in Billboard magazine, is a record chart that features Latin music sales information. This data are compiled by Nielsen SoundScan from a sample that includes music stores, music departments at electronics and department stores, Internet sales (both physical and digital) and verifiable sales from concert venues in the United States.

There were 23 number-one albums in 2008; one of these, La Vida... Es un Ratico by Colombian singer-songwriter Juanes, won five Latin Grammy Awards, including Album of the Year. One month after the death of their lead vocalist Sergio Gómez in late December 2007, the Chicago-based group K-Paz de la Sierra returned to the top of the chart with Capaz de Todo Por Tí, which was number one for six consecutive weeks. Cómplices, the eighth number-one album by Mexican singer Luis Miguel, debuted at number 10 on the Billboard 200, the highest peak for the singer on that chart, with 32,000 album units sold. This album also gave the singer the record for the most number-one albums on this chart for one month, until it was tied by fellow Mexican singer-songwriters Marco Antonio Solís and Los Temerarios. This record was broken on October 25, 2008 by Solís with the debut of his ninth number-one album No Molestar.

Vicente Fernández's Para Siempre won the Latin Grammy Award for Best Ranchero Album; it spent three non-consecutive weeks at the top of the chart. Primera Fila, a live album by Fernández, was the last number-one album of 2008. With 26,000 album units sold, Daddy Yankee debuted at number 13 on the Billboard 200 with Talento de Barrio, a soundtrack for the movie that starred the reggaeton performer, which also debuted at number one on this chart. Wisin & Yandel returned to number one with Los Extraterrestres, an album that was awarded with the Latin Grammy Award for Best Urban Music Album. and ended the year as the best selling Latin album of 2008. On November 29, another Wisin & Yandel recording, a collaboration with DJ Nesty, titled La Mente Maestra debuted at number one. R.K.M & Ken-Y, Flex, Jenni Rivera and Los Pikadientes de Caborca peaked at number one for the first time in their careers. Luis Fonsi's Palabras del Silencio, earned his best sales week ever with 30,000 album copies sold and the second-largest sales week of the year for a Latin performer; only Luis Miguel's Cómplices sold more (32,000 albums in May). This album became the second number-one album on this chart for Fonsi.

Albums

See also

 Billboard Top Latin Albums

References

2008 Latin
United States Latin Albums
2008 in Latin music